The House at 44 Stanton Road in Brookline, Massachusetts, is a well-preserved local example of Italianate architecture, and is one of four houses of that style on Stanton Road. The -story wood-frame house was built c. 1864–65 by James Edmonds. It has deep eaves with paired brackets, a small centered gable on the front facade, and bracketed windows. Its full height front porch is probably a later addition. It was moved a short distance to its present location in 1901.

The house was listed on the National Register of Historic Places in 1985.

See also
 National Register of Historic Places listings in Brookline, Massachusetts

References

Houses in Brookline, Massachusetts
Italianate architecture in Massachusetts
Houses completed in 1864
National Register of Historic Places in Brookline, Massachusetts
Houses on the National Register of Historic Places in Norfolk County, Massachusetts